Marie Kathleen De Becker (13 June 1880 – 23 March 1946) was an English-American stage and screen actress.

Family
She was born in Islington, London, the daughter of Benevenuto Nicola de Becker, a shipping clerk, and his wife Catherine (or Kate) Elizabeth de Becker (née Kerin). Two of her siblings were also actors: her sister Ernestine, known as Nesta (mother of actress Ernestine Barrier) and her brother Harold.

Career
Marie De Becker was best known for playing mature character parts, notably in the 1940s films Mrs. Miniver, Random Harvest and Devotion.

De Becker's first stage acting roles were when her family were living in Camberwell, South London. At the age of 19, she played "Joyce" in the 1899 production by J. Pitt Hardacre's Company of East Lynne at the Theatre Metropole in Camberwell, when her young brother Harold had a juvenile part as "Little Willie".  In 1900 she played "Humpty Dumpty" (the Nurse) in several Provincial productions (in England and Scotland) of the stage adaptation of John Strange Winter's novel, Bootle's Baby, alongside her sister Nesta as "Mignon", the eponymous baby. In 1902 she appeared as "Jane" in Uncles and Aunts at Dover, Coventry and Cardiff.

Filmography

References

External links
 
 

1880 births
1946 deaths
British film actresses
20th-century British actresses
Actresses from London
British expatriate actresses in the United States
19th-century British actresses
British stage actresses
19th-century English women
19th-century English people
20th-century English women
20th-century English people